The Tramway Français Standard (TFS) is a type of tram designed and manufactured by Alstom for use on various tramway systems in France. The TFS is no longer in production, having been superseded by the Alstom Citadis range of tramcars.

Two different models of the TFS were produced, both being articulated designs. The first model, the TFS-1, was built for the opening of the Nantes tram system in 1985. As built, these were single-articulated 6-axle tramcars with a high floor and steep stepped access from low level boarding platforms. All the tramcars built in this form have since been rebuilt with an added low-floor centre section, thus becoming 8-axle double-articulated cars. Nantes subsequently bought additional TFS-1 trams in this 8-axle configuration.

For the opening of the Grenoble tram system, the TFS-2 variant was created. This was also a 6-axle tramcar, but had a different articulation mechanism with a very short central section carried on a four-wheel truck. This allowed a low floor to be carried through most of the length of the car and between the wheels of the central truck, although the sections over the outer bogies are still at a high level and accessed by three steps from the low-floor section. All the doors are within the low-floor section. The advantages of this layout ensured that all subsequent users of the TFS tramcar have adopted the TFS-2 variant.

TFS-2

Technical data
The cars cannot work as multiple units, although in case of an emergency two cars may be coupled using an emergency coupling system.

The tramcars have the following characteristics:

Car
The car has 3 bogies, one on each ends and one below the central portion.

Motors
The two outer bogies are each equipped with a 275 kW electric motor.

Operation
Like most modern trams, the TFS vehicles are one-person-operated. The driver is responsible for monitoring activity on board, including the operation of the doors. In most versions of the TFS, a single lever controls both acceleration and braking and contain an integrated dead man's switch. The versions used in Saint-Etienne, though, use pedals, consistent with the earlier PCC trams. The tramcars are equipped with land-train radios and ICS, infrared SAM and onboard pointwork control.

Fleet
Currently, TFS or TFS-derived trams are used on all lines of the tramway networks in Nantes, Grenoble, and Saint Etienne, as well as on Île-de-France tramway Line 1 operated by the RATP north of Paris. They had formerly operated on Île-de-France tramway Line 2 west of Paris and in Rouen until they were replaced by Alstom Citadis trams in 2002 and 2012, respectively. The TFS trams on Paris line 2 were moved to line 1, and the ex-Rouen trams were sent to Gaziantep, Turkey in 2013.

References

Alstom trams
Tram vehicles of France
Tram transport in France
Train-related introductions in 1985
750 V DC multiple units